Wheeler–Watkins Baseball Complex is a baseball venue in Montgomery, Alabama, United States.  It is home to the Alabama State Hornets baseball team of the NCAA Division I Southwestern Athletic Conference.  The venue is named for two former Alabama State baseball coaches, Herbert Wheeler and Larry Watkins.  Opened in March 2011, the facility has a capacity of 500 spectators.

Naming 
On February 17, 2012, the facility was dedicated to Herbert Wheeler and Larry Watkins, two former Hornet baseball coaches.  Wheeler coached the program from the 1960s to 1981.  Watkins, who played under and coached with Wheeler, coached the program from 1982 to 2011.  Watkins had over 500 career wins by the time of his retirement, the most of any Alabama State baseball coach.

See also 
 List of NCAA Division I baseball venues

References 

College baseball venues in the United States
Baseball venues in Alabama
Alabama State Hornets baseball
Alabama State Hornets and Lady Hornets sports venues
2011 establishments in Alabama
Sports venues completed in 2011